Battlestar (Lemar Hoskins) is a superhero appearing in American comic books published by Marvel Comics. Created by Mark Gruenwald and Paul Neary, the character made his first appearance in Captain America #323 (1986). He became the fifth character to assume the alias Bucky before taking on the name "Battlestar."

Clé Bennett portrayed the character in the Marvel Cinematic Universe television series The Falcon and the Winter Soldier (2021).

Publication history
Battlestar was created by Mark Gruenwald and Paul Neary, and was originally introduced as a nameless member of the Bold Urban Commandos in Captain America #323 (1986). In Captain America #327 he is called "Lemar" for the first time, but generally is still treated as interchangeable with the other BUCs. He rises from anonymity in Captain America #334, in which his full name is revealed and he adopts the identity of Bucky. Gruenwald later explained:

Writer Dwayne McDuffie informed Gruenwald that "Buck" is considered a derogatory term among African-Americans, as it was a term used before the American Civil War to refer to male slaves, and said that it was also racially offensive to have an adult black man taking on the identity of a teenage sidekick.  Writer Mark Gruenwald had not known of the racial connotation of "Bucky", having grown up in a region with very few African-Americans, and worked with McDuffie to create a story to address the problem and give Hoskins a new name.

In Captain America #341 he is renamed Battlestar, dons his own unique costume, and is more explicitly presented as a partner to the new Captain America, rather than a sidekick. Gruenwald recalled, "The search for a good name for a partner to Cap is a whole half-hour unto itself. [laughs] We came up with every single name which was vaguely patriotic, vaguely military, and yet stood on its own, because some day these guys may split up." The name "Battlestar" was ultimately suggested by Captain America penciler Kieron Dwyer.

Fictional character biography
Lemar Hoskins was born in Chicago, Illinois. Along with his Army buddies John Walker, Hector Lennox, and Jerome Johnson, he is given superhuman attributes by Dr. Karl Malus on behalf of the Power Broker, and they become wrestlers. The four later form the Bold Urban Commandos (also known as the "BUCkies"), and are employed by John Walker, known as the Super-Patriot. The Buckies stage a fake attack on the Super-Patriot for publicity. As a BUCky, Hoskins also attacks a group of foreign students.

When the Federal Commission on Superhuman Activities selects Walker to replace Steve Rogers as Captain America, Hoskins is the only one in his group allowed to accompany the new Captain America. He takes the identity of Bucky (after Rogers' original partner Bucky) and undergoes a rigorous training under the supervision of the Commission. Walker and Hoskins go undercover on a mission to stop the Watchdogs.

Hoskins, who is African American, is persuaded by another black man that "Bucky" is a demeaning title, since American slaveholders often referred to male slaves as "bucks." Consequently, Hoskins takes on the identity of Battlestar, wearing a new costume and wielding a shield patterned after the one Steve Rogers originally carried. Captain America and Battlestar capture Quill but are defeated in combat by Quill's team, the Resistants. The duo fight and defeat Demolition Man. Battlestar witnesses the Flag-Smasher's capture of Captain America. Battlestar persuades Steve Rogers, the original Captain America, to help him rescue Walker from the Flag-Smasher, and they battle ULTIMATUM. Battlestar witnesses the faked assassination of Walker and leaves the Commission's employ. He confronts Dr. Valerie Cooper and learns that Walker is still alive.

Battlestar meets the Falcon and aids him in battling Coachwhip, Puff Adder, and Rock Python of the Serpent Society.

Battlestar confronts and fights the U.S. Agent.  Battlestar is captured by the Power Tools. Dr. Karl Malus employs the Power Tools to collect previous clients of Power Broker Inc., so that Malus can perform tests upon them. Malus subjects Battlestar to the de-augmentation process. Subsequently, Hoskins fights the Power Broker and his superhuman strength is restored by Malus. Hoskins then reconciles with U.S. Agent.

When Steve Rogers resumes the identity of Captain America, Battlestar leaves federal employment and returns to his native Chicago. He becomes a member of Silver Sable's Wild Pack for some time. When Ernst Sablinova, Sable's father, wants the Pack to murder a captive, Battlestar disobeys.

During the "Civil War" storyline, Battlestar allies himself with many opposed to the Superhuman Registration Act. His group includes, but are not limited to, Typeface, Gladiatrix and Solo. During a visit by reporter Sally Floyd, S.H.I.E.L.D. agents operating alongside Iron Man attack and capture many of the group. Floyd and a few others escape. Battlestar suffers a back injury during the battle and due to an oversight, does not receive proper medical care while in custody in Prison 42. He is freed by Captain America's forces and takes part in the final battle, despite his injuries.

Battlestar later returns, working as a security guard for Project Pegasus. He witnesses a zombie invasion from a parallel Earth and the return of Jack of Hearts. He also participated in an A.R.M.O.R. raid on a parallel Earth, infested by Nazi zombies, alongside a team of heroes which included Dum-Dum Dugan and Howard the Duck.

It was later mentioned during the "Death of Wolverine" that an unknown party had managed to steal Battlestar's adamantium shield.

Battlestar participates in an Unlimited Class Wrestling Federation (UCWF) match against D-Man as part of a charity event. It is revealed that prior to becoming a superhero, Lemar had been an aspiring wrestler whose career was ended by D-Man. The charity fight ends when it is revealed that the current head of the UCWF is trying to abscond with the money raised by the event, and the two heroes team up to stop the robbery.

During the "Secret Empire" storyline, Battlestar appears as a member of the Underground when Hydra overtakes the United States.

Lemar is called to investigate the disappearance of US Agent, but is intercepted by a new super soldier who feels that Lemar is not doing enough to promote racial equality. The soldier breaks his arm.

Powers and abilities
As a result of the experimental mutagenic process conducted on him by Karl Malus on behalf of the Power Broker, Lemar Hoskins has superhuman strength, durability, speed, stamina, reflexes, and agility. Battlestar is highly trained in gymnastics and acrobatics. He is an exceptional hand-to-hand combatant, and received rigorous training in unarmed combat and the use of his shield, in a style similar to the original Captain America, from the Taskmaster.

He carries a near indestructible blunt-end triangular adamantium shield in combat, and is capable of using it defensively against kinetic and energy based attacks, and offensively as a missile weapon.

Reception

Accolades 

 In 2021, Screen Rant included Battlestar in their "10 Most Powerful Alternate Versions Of Bucky In Marvel Comics" list and in their "Marvel Comics: 10 Strongest Shield Wielding Characters (Who Aren’t Steve Rogers)" list.

In other media

Television 
 Battlestar makes a non-speaking appearance in the Spider-Man animated television series five-part episode "Six Forgotten Warriors". This version is a member of the Wild Pack.
 Battlestar makes a non-speaking appearance in the Spider-Man animated television series episode "Take Two". This version is a member of the Wild Pack. Battlestar accompanies the group in their theft of the Neuro Cortex from Horizon High for an anonymous client. This leads to a battle with Spider-Man and Doctor Octopus, during which the web-slinger tricks Battlestar and Paladin into taking each other out. The Wild Pack are subsequently arrested and imprisoned.
 Lemar Hoskins / Battlestar appears in the live-action Marvel Cinematic Universe / Disney+ miniseries The Falcon and the Winter Soldier, portrayed by Clé Bennett. Introduced in the episode "The Star-Spangled Man", this version works for the U.S. Army and is John Walker's friend and partner. In the episode "The Whole World Is Watching", Hoskins is accidentally killed by Karli Morgenthau while helping Walker apprehend her and the Flag Smashers.

References

External links
 World of Black Heroes: Battlestar Biography
 Battlestar entry on Marvel Universe
 Battlestar entry on Marvel Directory

African-American superheroes
Characters created by Mark Gruenwald
Characters created by Paul Neary
Comics characters introduced in 1986
Fictional characters from Chicago
Fictional professional wrestlers
Fictional shield fighters
Fictional United States Army personnel
Marvel Comics characters with superhuman strength
Marvel Comics martial artists
Marvel Comics military personnel
Marvel Comics mutates
Marvel Comics superheroes
United States-themed superheroes